Kristian Liebrand (born March 3, 1973 in Rhede, Germany) is a photographer from Germany, who concentrates on nude art photography of women.

Liebrand has been featured in a number of photo magazines, Lifestyle magazines, professional journals and TV stations.

Background

Since 2010 Liebrand has received achievements in international photo contests.

His works have been published in a fine nude art book entitled  more than nude – fine art photography published in 2012 and more than nude - exclusive edition book published in 2014

Between 2008 and 2015 Liebrand lived and worked in Bocholt, Germany. 2016 he moved to Bochum where he built a new photo studio, called "Visible" along with many photo sets on a 360 square meters.

Between 2014 and 2016 he published the charity calendar, Mehr als eine Badewanne (more than a bathtube) aimed at fighting against the lack of water in Africa.

Achievements and awards 

 2010: Finalist Deutschlands bester Fotograf (Category Ästhetischer Akt)
 2011: Finalist Deutschlands bester Fotograf (Category Ästhetischer Akt)
 2012: Finalist Deutschlands bester Fotograf (Category Ästhetischer Akt)
 2012: Winner Deutschlands bester Fotograf (Category black&white)
 2011: Nominated for Eros award 2011
 2012: Nominated for Black & White Spider Award 
 2012: 2 Wins at Eros award 2012
 2013: Nominated for Photography Masters Cup 2013 (Category Professional, Nude)
 2013: Winner User Voting Akt und Erotik (digital photo) 2013
2013: Nominated for Fotograf des Jahres 2013 (digital photo)
2013: 3. Winner (honor of distinction, professionals) Black & White Spider Award 
 2013: Gold medal Photo Art Championship 2013
2014: Finalist Zebra Award (Black and White Photographer of the Year 2014, Fine Art)
2014: Winner Fotograf des Jahres 2014 (Akt & Erotik, digitalphoto)
2014: Nominated for Black & White Spider Award, 2014, professionals nude
2014: IPA 2014, Fine Art Nudes Pro, - Honorable Mention (International Photography Awards, 8-68936-14)
2014: ND awards 2014, fine art nudes, - Honorable Mention
2014: Monochrome Awards 2014, Professional Nudes,- Honorable Mention
2015: Photoshoot Awards 2015, Nudes, Honorable Mention
2015: Fine Art Photography Awards 2015, 2nd winner in NUDES Professional
2015: Two nominations for the Black & White Spider Award 2015
2015: International photographer of the year 2015 (ipoty) - Honorable Mention, professionals nude
2016: Nominee in Nude Black & White Spider Award 2016
2016: Bronze Medal One Eyeland Photography Awards 2016, Fine Art Nude
2017: Honorable Mention in Nudes Monovisions Award
2017: 3rd Place Winner in Nudes Professional CHROMATIC INTERNATIONAL PHOTOGRAPHY AWARDS
2018: Finalist One Eyeland Photography Awards, Fine Art Nude
2018: Winner Germany´s TOP 10 Black & White Photographer
2018: Silver medal World´s TOP 10 Black & White Photographer
2018: Gold medal TRIERENBERG SUPER CIRCUIT 2018, black&white
2019: Nominee at the 12th Annual International Color Awards'
2019: Finalist PhotoShoot Awards Nude 2019, urban nude & merits in category body parts
2019: Winner MonoVisions Black and White Photography Awards 2019, Nude
2019: Nominee at Black & White Spider Awards, 2019, Nude Professionals
2019: Nominee at the 12th Annual International Color Awards'
2020: Bronze medal One Eyeland Photography Award 2019, Fine Art - Nudes Professional
2020: Finalist & merits PhotoShoot Awards NUDE 2020, urban nude
2020: Finalist Fine Art Photography Awards, Nudes Professional
2021: Silver medal One Eyeland Awards, fine art nudes
2021: Gold medal Trierenberg Supercircuit, streets & paths
2021: Finalist PhotoShoot Awards, NUDE, body parts
2021: 1st place 6TH 35AWARDS, Nude 18+ - Viewers Choice
2021: Honorable Mention Black & White Nude Photo of the Year 2021 - Monovisions Award, nude
2021: 1st place Black & White Nude Photo of the Year 2021 "Monovisions Award, nude
2021: 1st place One Eyeland Awards "Germany´s Top 10 Black & White Photographer
2021: Silver medal One Eyeland Awards - WORLD´s Top 10 Black & White Photographer, nude
2021: 2 Honorable Mentions Black & White Spider Awards, 2021, nude professionals
2021: Honorable Mention - Chromatic Awards Photography 2021, nudes professionals
2021: 2 Bronze Awards One Eyeland Awards - fine art nudes, professional 2021
2022: best photographer - 35AWARDS - 2022, black & white nude
2022: great photographer - viewers choice 35AWARDS - 2022, 100 best photos
2022: Nominee & honorable mention 15th Annual International Color Awards, nudes professional
2022: 3 nominations Fine Art Photography Awards (FAPA) 2021/2022, nudes professional
2022: 1st place MUSE photography awards 2022, nudes professional
2022: 2 photos best of nomination - 7th 35AWARDS, nudes
2022: 4th place 100 best photos - 7th 35AWARDS, nudes
2022: Platinum Winner London Photography Awards, professional nudes
2022: Silver Award & Bronze Award WPE Worldcup Photography Award, 1st half 2022, fine art nudes
2022: 3x Platin Awards & 5 Gold Awards European Photography Awards 2022
2022: Nominee at the "Black and White Spider Awards Awards", nude - professional
2022: Gold Award "New York Photography Awards 2022", professional nudes
2022: 2 Bronze Awards World´s Top 10 Photographer Black and White - One Eyeland 2022, nudes professional
2022: finalist dodho nude photography awards 2022
2022: honorable mention Monochrome Awards 2022, nude, professional

Exhibitions

2011: January: Adiamo, Oberhausen, Germany
2012: March: Adagio, Berlin, Germany 
 2012: August to October: Große Freiheit 36, Hamburg, Germany
 2013: July to September: Gallery Long Island City, New York, USA
 2013: October: Gallery Merikon, Vienna, Austria
 2014: June to July: The Modern Nude, The Brick Lane Gallery, London, United Kingdom
 2015: November to December: Wasser spendet Leben, Gallery stilwerk, Dortmund, Germany
 2016: August to October: Gallery Hartlauer, Linz, Austria
 2016: September: GIESERS Kalender 2017, Bocholt, Germany
 2016: November: Wasser spendet Leben, Bochum, Germany
 2018: Oktober: Glas Hennes Kalender, Frechen, Germany
 2019: September: Mundwerk - Mutspenden, Berlin, Germany
 2020: December: 2020: Museo Civico del Territorio di Cormòns (Gorizia), urban 2020 photography award, Italy
 2022: September: Charity-Vernissage Nude for Nature, historic train station, Wuppertal, Germany

References

https://www.mopo.de/hamburg/in-hamburg-wie-ein-fotograf-mit-nacktfotos-spenden-fuer-blutkrebs-patienten-sammelt-37855684/

https://www.stern.de/fotografie/viewfotocommunity/fotografen/-urban-nude---mutige-aktfotografien-im-kampf-gegen-den-blutkrebs-8908574.html

https://www.berliner-woche.de/zehlendorf/c-soziales/kieferorthopaeden-und-fotograf-wollen-die-dkms-mit-aktfoto-kalender-unterstuetzen_a232417

https://www.bild.de/regional/mecklenburg-vorpommern/mecklenburg-vorpommern-news/models-nackt-in-der-oeffentlichkeit-warum-diese-fotos-mut-machen-74548780.bild.html

https://viewer.joomag.com/photoweekly-25112020/0594489001606238578?page=5

External links
 Homepage 

1973 births
Living people
Photographers from Berlin
People from Rhede